The Derby Cyclo-cross Series are a cyclo-cross race held in Derby, England, for the first time in 2007. The race held a January date between 2007 and 2009 and was not held in 2010. In 2011, the race returned for men only with a November date.

Past winners

References
  (men)
  (women)

Cycle races in England
Cyclo-cross races
Recurring sporting events established in 2007
2007 establishments in England